"Nothin' but The Taillights" is a song co-written and recorded by American country music artist Clint Black. The song reached the top of the Billboard Hot Country Singles & Tracks chart. It was released in January 1998 as the third single and title track from his album of the same name.  The song was written by Black and Steve Wariner. This became the first song in which Clint Black began a songwriting partnership with Steve Wariner. Very soon after, Clint Black and Steve Wariner began writing some new songs together for Clint Black's future studio releases.

Content
The song is an uptempo, in which the narrator is on the side of the road after being left by his lover. She drives his pickup truck away down the Kentucky highway and all he can see is the tail lights.

Chart performance
"Nothin' But The Taillights" debuted at number 43 on the Hot Country Singles & Tracks chart in mid-January 1998, and quickly climbed to Number One in March, where it held for two weeks. This single became Black's eleventh number-one single, twenty-sixth Top Ten single, and twenty-seventh Top Twenty single.

Year-end charts

References

1998 singles
1997 songs
Clint Black songs
Songs written by Clint Black
Songs written by Steve Wariner
Song recordings produced by Clint Black
Song recordings produced by James Stroud
RCA Records Nashville singles
Songs about Kentucky